Five Centuries of Spanish Literature: From the Cid through the Golden Age is a popular textbook providing a selection of Spanish literature from the 12th through 17th  centuries. First published in 1962.

The book is currently published by Waveland Press Inc.

Table of contents
 Introduction
 Part I. The Medieval Period
 The Twelfth Century
 The Thirteenth Century
 The Fourteenth Century
 The Fifteenth Century
 Part II. The Modern Age
 The Renaissance in Spain
 Lyric Poetry of the Renaissance
 Mystic Prose
 Imaginative Fiction
 The Theater before Lope de Vega
 Cervantes and the Modern Novel
 Poetry of the Seventeenth Century
 The Drama from Lope de Vega to Calderón

1962 books
Spanish literature
Dodd, Mead & Co. books